Bactra is a genus of moths belonging to the subfamily Olethreutinae of the family Tortricidae.

Species
Bactra ablabes Turner, 1946
Bactra aciculata Diakonoff, 1963
Bactra adelographa Diakonoff, 1983
Bactra adelpha Diakonoff, 1963
Bactra adoceta Diakonoff, 1964
Bactra aletha Diakonoff, 1963
Bactra alexandri Diakonoff, 1962
Bactra ametra Diakonoff, 1983
Bactra amseli Diakonoff, 1959
Bactra angulata Diakonoff, 1956
Bactra anthracosema Turner, 1916
Bactra atopa Diakonoff, 1989
Bactra bactrana (Kennel, 1901)
Bactra blepharopis Meyrick, 1911
Bactra boesemani Diakonoff, 1956
Bactra boschmai Diakonoff, 1956
Bactra capnopepla Turner, 1946
Bactra cerata (Meyrick, 1909)
Bactra chariessa Diakonoff, 1964
Bactra clarescens Meyrick, 1912
Bactra clarkei Diakonoff, 1964
Bactra confusa Diakonoff, 1963
Bactra contraria Diakonoff, 1956
Bactra coronata Diakonoff, 1950
Bactra crithopa Diakonoff, 1957
Bactra cultellana Zeller, 1877
Bactra diachorda Meyrick, 1932
Bactra diakonoffi Amsel, 1958
Bactra difissa Diakonoff, 1964
Bactra distinctana Mabille, 1900
Bactra dolia Diakonoff, 1963
Bactra egenana Kennel, 1901
Bactra endea Diakonoff, 1963
Bactra erasa Meyrick, 1928
Bactra erema Diakonoff, 1964
Bactra extrema Diakonoff, 1962
Bactra fasciata Diakonoff, 1963
Bactra festa Diakonoff, 1959
Bactra fracta Diakonoff, 1964
Bactra furfurana (Haworth, [1811])
Bactra fuscidorsana Zeller, 1877
Bactra honesta Meyrick, 1909
Bactra hostilis Diakonoff, 1956
Bactra jansei Diakonoff, 1963
Bactra kostermansi Diakonoff, 1956
Bactra lacteana Caradja, 1916
Bactra lancealana (Hubner, [1796-1799])
Bactra legitima Meyrick, 1911
Bactra maiorina Heinrich, 1923
Bactra meridiana Diakonoff, 1956
Bactra metriacma Meyrick, 1909
Bactra minima Meyrick, 1909
Bactra misoolensia Diakonoff, 1956
Bactra nea Diakonoff, 1964
Bactra nesiotis Diakonoff, 1963
Bactra neuricana Zeller, 1877
Bactra noteraula Walsingham, in Sharp, 1907
Bactra oceani Diakonoff, 1956
Bactra ochrographa Diakonoff, 1989
Bactra optanias Meyrick, 1911
Bactra orbiculi Diakonoff, 1956
Bactra perisema Diakonoff, 1964
Bactra phaulopa Meyrick, 1911
Bactra philocherda Diakonoff, 1964
Bactra priapeia Heinrich, 1923
Bactra psammitis Turner, 1916
Bactra punctistrigana  Mabille, 1900
Bactra pythonia Meyrick, 1910
Bactra rhabdonoma Diakonoff, 1963
Bactra robustana (Christoph, 1872)
Bactra salpictris Diakonoff, 1963
Bactra sardonia (Meyrick, 1908)
Bactra scrupulosa Meyrick, 1911
Bactra seria Meyrick, 1917
Bactra simpliciana Chrtien, 1915
Bactra simplissima (Diakonoff, 1953)
Bactra sinassula Diakonoff, 1963
Bactra sinistra Heinrich, 1926
Bactra solivaga Diakonoff, 1956
Bactra sordidata Diakonoff, 1963
Bactra spinosa Diakonoff, 1963
Bactra stagnicolana Zeller, 1852
Bactra stramenticia Diakonoff, 1953
Bactra straminea (Butler, 1881)
Bactra suedana Bengtsson, 1989
Bactra testudinea Turner, 1916
Bactra tornastis Meyrick, 1909
Bactra tradens Diakonoff, 1963
Bactra transvola Meyrick, 1924
Bactra triceps Diakonoff, 1963
Bactra trimera Diakonoff, 1963
Bactra tylophora Diakonoff, 1963
Bactra vaga Diakonoff, 1964
Bactra venosana (Zeller, 1847)
Bactra verutana Zeller, 1875

See also
List of Tortricidae genera

References

Diakonoff A. 1963c. African species of the genus Bactra (Lepidoptera, Tortricidae). - Tijdschrift voor Entomologie 106(7):285–356.

External links
tortricidae.com

Bactrini
Tortricidae genera
Taxa named by James Francis Stephens